is a Japanese light novel series written by Riku Misora and illustrated by Won. The story is set in a fantasy world where the titular "failed knight" Ikki Kurogane meets Stella Vermillion, who is considered a prodigy. The two make up for each other's weaknesses and form a relationship while training to become great knights. The first volume was released on July 15, 2013. An anime adaptation aired in late 2015.

The light novels have sold 1.5 million print copies by February 2017.

Plot

In an alternate Earth, humans called "Blazers" have supernatural abilities. These Blazers can materialize weapons known as a "Device" which are made through a person's soul. At , Blazers are selected as representatives for the Seven Star Sword Art Festival, an annual tournament event held by the seven Mage Knight Academies in Japan to determine the strongest Apprentice Knight. Hagun's performance ranking in the festival is falling and the academy's director, Kurono Shinguji, is determined to find a solution to the problem. Ikki Kurogane is the academy's F-Rank Blazer and is considered "The Worst One" for his low magical abilities, but Stella Vermillion, the princess of the European country Vermillion, is one of the top A-Rank Blazers.

On Stella's first day at Hagun Academy, she is arranged to share a room with Ikki as a transfer student of the academy. When Ikki inadvertently discovers Stella half-dressed, he is challenged to duel where the loser has to be obedient to the winner for life. She ends up losing the duel, but they agree to become roommates as Ikki's one and only merciful desire. The series follows their adventures as they train to qualify as the school's representatives for the festival.

Characters

A member of the distinguished Kurogane Family, Ikki was subjected to ill treatment from his own family since childhood; however, his great-grandfather, Ryoma Kurogane, a legendary Blazer and hero, encouraged Ikki to never give up and become strong, after which he continued to work hard on his craft. Due to his family's influence on the school coupled with less-than-average grades (due to his low magical abilities), he was forced to repeat a year; however, when the school administration changed, along with the academic standards, Ikki was able to more fully participate, with the condition that he would be unable to graduate if he failed at the Seven Star tournament or even failed to qualify. He relies on learning his opponents' skills and tactics, a technique called "Blade Steal". Later, he unlocks stronger version of this ability called "Perfect Vision" which allows him to predict his opponents thoughts and moves. At the start of the series, he is challenged by Stella in a duel where the loser has to obey the winner. Although he wins the duel, his main order is that he and Stella become roommates and get along. After defeating his past-year rival, Shizuya Kirihara, Ikki gets a new nickname, . Although he attracts the affections of many girls, he and Stella eventually develop a relationship. Despite vicious interference from Kurogane family members, Ikki qualifies as a Hagun Academy representative and he and Stella become engaged.

The main heroine of the series, Stella is a red-haired A-Rank Blazer who is considered to be a once-in-a-decade genius. The second princess of the Vermillion Kingdom (a small European country), Stella could not control her own powers as a child and was badly burned each time she tried to use them. Through her effort, she eventually mastered her own power and is widely regarded as a genius by those around her. Not wanting to become conceited, Stella then decided to transfer to Japan. At the start of the story, she challenges Ikki to a duel where the loser must obey the winner, but she loses. Although they agree to be roommates, Stella feels it is her noble's obligation to treat him as a master. She is immediately jealous of other girls being affectionate towards Ikki, and over the course of the series, she falls in love with Ikki. They eventually become a couple and get engaged after both she and Ikki qualify for the Seven Star tournament.

Ikki's younger sister who is extremely obsessed with him. She has white hair, unlike her brother, who has black hair. Nicknamed , a B-Rank Blazer who excels in magic control. Shizuku hates her family for their treatment of Ikki and generally dislikes holding the family name. She initially disapproved of Ikki's relationship with Stella, but eventually accepted her and decided to take it upon herself to teach Stella about being a bride of the Kurogane family, though she still made up her own restricting rules. Originally, she was an odds-on favorite to qualify as a Hagun Academy representative to the Seven Star tournament, but is eliminated during the qualifying matches.

Alice is a first year student and Shizuku's roommate. She is described as "a maiden who was born into the body of a man", and in the English translation, female pronouns are used to refer to her. Nicknamed Black Sonia, she has the ability to control shadows with her device, the Darkness Hermit. Her Noble Arts include Shadow Bind (影縫い), Shadow Walk (日陰道) and Shadow Spot. Alice is a very nice person, though she does sometimes tease others. She is a good friend of Shizuku, who opens up to her. She is later revealed to be an assassin of the terrorist organization Rebellion as well as a member of Akatsuki, which infiltrated Hagun Academy. She had a dark past, being an orphan who lost her friend Yuuri, and was taken into Rebellion by Wallenstein. In Chapter 36, she attacked Newspaper Club member Kagami and stole her research when she started to uncover evidence of the existence of Akatsuki. However, she turned against Rebellion, due to her friendship with Shizuku.
 

A third-year student of Hagun Academy and the daughter of a famous swordsman named Kaito Ayatsuji. Ayase approaches Ikki and asks for his guidance to improve her swordsmanship. Two years prior to the current story, her father fought against Kuraudo, a Blazer from Tonrou Academy, with their dojo on the line and ended up in a coma with the dojo being taken over by Kuraudo. After this event, Ayase constantly challenged Kuraudo, but to no avail. She hoped to enter the Seven Star Sword Art Festival to have a chance to get the dojo back to the point where she was willing to use any means possible, even cheating, to win. In her qualifying match against Ikki, who had been teaching her swordsmanship and by that time considered her a friend, she secretly rigged the arena to ensure her victory, but Ikki, who suspected her intentions, not only refused to expose her cheating but also defeated her. Later, he defeated Kuraudo at the dojo to regain its ownership for Ayase. Ayase confessed her cheating to the school authorities, earning her a suspension and elimination from Seven Star Sword Art Festival contention, and her father emerged from his coma.
 

Tohka is a third year student, the president of the Hagun student council, and the strongest student of the school, being one of the 4 strongest student knights in Japan. She has long light brown hair and wears glasses. She has the nickname Raikiri, and is a B-rank knight with the ability to manipulate lightning. Her Device is a katana named Narukami and her Noble Arts are Raikiri (雷切), Reverse Sight (閃理眼), Shippu Jinrai (疾風迅雷) and Takemikazuchi. She is a nice person, caring a lot about others. She was raised in an orphanage, due to her parents having died to an illness. She is famed for her Noble Art Raikiri, which is a slash powered by lightning, that is believed to be invincible.
 

 The chief of the International Mage Knight Federation - Japan branch. Ikki and Shizuku's father. He cares more for the prestige of the Kurogane family than for his children's actual welfare and well-being.
  
 Ikki's older brother. He is a member of Akatsuki. His alias is Kaze no kentei (風の剣帝). He is ranked A. Ouma has little interest in anything besides fighting strong opponents to test the limits of his strength. His younger brother, Ikki, described Ouma as an incredibly stoic person who is only interested in becoming stronger.
 "Twin-Wings"  
The top-ranking Blazer in the world. Edelweiss is a criminal whose capture has been given up on due to her immense strength. She is also one of the few Desperado (or Majin) in the world. She has taken an interest in Ikki Kurogane after their first fight, telling Kurono Shinguuji to tell Ikki to become a worthy opponent for next time they meet.
  
 A blond haired guy with a black hairband. He is a third-year student and crowned Sword King in the 61st Seven Stars Festival. He has a younger sister who blames his injuries to her fault, which led her aphasia. To cure younger sister and himself, Yudai became stronger than before and find himself as Sword King in Seven Stars.
 

Kirihara is a second-year student. His nickname is the Hunter, and is a popular C-Rank knight. His Device is a bow called Oborotsuki, and his Noble Arts are Area Invisibility (狩人の森) and Million Rain (驟雨烈光閃). He is an arrogant and sadistic person, who bullied Ikki during his first year due to his status as, the worst one. In his match against Ikki, he tormented him by mocking him, and getting the crowd on his side to mock him, but they were silenced by Stella. Ikki pulled off a turnabout, and defeated Kirihara, who passed out from fear of pain. He is not seen again after his defeat, but it is likely he has lost his popularity.
 

The ace of Tonrō Academy. A C-Rank Blazer nicknamed the  due to having defeated many swordsmen. He was in the top 8 at the previous years Seven Star Battle Festival. When Ikki defeats him, he returns the dojo ownership to Ayase's family.
 

Renren is a second-year student and the general affairs manager of the student council. She has short hair and is rather short. Nicknamed Runner's High, and is C-Ranked, having the ability to accumulate her own acceleration. She is the third strongest student of Hagun Academy.
 

Utakata is a third-year student and the vice-president of the student council. He is a small boy with white hair. His nickname is Fifty-Fifty, a D-Rank knight. His Noble Art is Black Box, which lets him alter the outcomes of events through probability. He is very playful, and an old friend of Tohka and Kanata.
 

Kanata is a third-year student, and the treasurer of the student council, who is considered the second strongest student of Hagun Academy. She has long blonde hair, and wears a long white dress. She is nicknamed Scharlach Frau, and is a B-Ranked Knight, being able to turn her rapier Device into diamonds which she can control. Kanata is also an old friend of Tohka and Utakata.

Production
After winning an award for his previous light novel series Danzai no Exceed, Riku Misora decided to write a sport-related novel in the vein of Akamitsu Awamura's Mugen no Linkage.

Media

Light novels
The original release of the series was in a light novel format, which was written by Riku Misora and illustrated by Won. Chivalry of a Failed Knight has been published by SB Creative's GA Bunko imprint since July 16, 2013. In December 2021, Misora stated that the final volume of the series is set to be released before the end of 2022. Sol Press acquired the license to the series and released the first three volumes in English on November 16, 2019. They released five volumes in total before going defunct.

{{Graphic novel list
 | VolumeNumber    = 1
 | OriginalRelDate         = July 13, 2013
 | OriginalISBN            = 978-4-7973-7468-1
 | LicensedRelDate = November 16, 2019<ref>{{cite book |url=https://solpress.co/product/752/chivalry-of-a-failed-knight-vol-1 |title=Chivalry of a Failed Knight Vol. 1 |website=Sol Press |date=November 16, 2019 |language=en |access-date=November 1, 2020 }}</ref>
 | LicensedISBN = 978-1-948838-20-7
 | ChapterList     = 
 | Summary         = 
 | LineColor       = C40233
}}

Manga

The series was adapted into a manga that was illustrated by Megumu Soramichi and printed in the monthly manga magazine Monthly Shonen Gangan from 2014 to 2017. It was collected in eleven tankōbon volumes. An anthology manga volume illustrated by various artists was published on December 13, 2014.

Anime

An anime adaptation was announced in March 2015. Produced by Silver Link and Nexus, the series ran on AT-X from October 3 to December 19, 2015 in Japan for 12 episodes; the episodes were later released by Media Factory through six DVD and Blu-ray volumes. Sentai Filmworks licensed the anime in September 2015 for digital and home media release in North America. The series was simulcast only on Hulu though as it aired in Japan and also aired on Crunchyroll. It was released on DVD and Blu-ray in North America on June 13, 2017.

After Crunchyroll was acquired by Sony Pictures Television, the parent company of Funimation in 2021, Chivalry of a Failed Knight, among several Sentai titles, was dropped from the service on March 31, 2022.

Reception
The light novels have been well received. According to Japanese light novel news website LN News, the series had 1.5 million copies in print by February 2017. Oricon ranked Chivalry of a Failed Knight as the 29th and 17th top-selling light novel series in November 2015 and May 2016, respectively. In addition, its anime adaptation also appeared on top-selling charts.

Anime News Network had six of their editors review the first episode of the anime adaptation: Lynzee Loveridge compared the series to The Asterisk War and while she considered the Chivalry characters to be more likeable, she was critical of the blended in CG artwork and considered Stella's becoming Ikki's servant to be "cringe-worthy"; Nick Creamer expressed criticism towards the episode and called it a "concentrated capsule of hoary clichés"; Hope Chapman called the episode's plot "soul-suckingly lame" and considered Asterisk as a much nicer series; Rebecca Silverman wrote that the first episode's plot was already done by Asterisk and Lance N' Masques and while she praises Stella for some initial character development, she says this gets lost with her "tsundere ranting"; and Zac Bertschy said that the anime is "a total waste of [the viewer's] time, but it serves a purpose, however unintentional.". The sixth reviewer, Theron Martin, agreed that "formulaic and generic" wouldn't be wrong ways to describe the story and he also praised Stella's underlying motivations. Martin concluded that while the series has potential, it needs to find "fresher angles" to stand out from other similar storylines. Silverman reviewed the anime's future episodes; she called the final episode "a triumphant one in terms of Ikki's battle against his own insecurities, his place at school, and his relationship with Stella", and would later go on to say that she was "pretty happy with this ending and [she] wouldn't be sad if another season materialized somewhere along the way."

Works cited
  "LN" is shortened form for light novel and refers to a volume number of the Chivalry of a Failed Knight light novels.
  "Ep." is shortened form for episode and refers to an episode of the Chivalry of a Failed Knight anime.
  "Ch." and "Vol." is shortened form for chapter and refers to a chapter number of the Chivalry of a Failed Knight manga.

See alsoHigh School Prodigies Have It Easy Even In Another World'' – Another light novel series by the same author.

References

External links
 at GA Bunko 
 
 

2013 Japanese novels
AT-X (TV network) original programming
Action anime and manga
Anime and manga based on light novels
Fantasy anime and manga
GA Bunko
Gangan Online manga
Japanese comedy novels
Japanese fantasy novels
Japanese webcomics
Light novels
Nexus (animation studio)
Novels set in fictional countries
Romance anime and manga
School life in anime and manga
Sentai Filmworks
Shōnen manga
Silver Link